Young Inlet is an Arctic waterway in Qikiqtaaluk Region, Nunavut, Canada. It is a natural bay in Sir William Parker Strait by northeastern Bathurst Island. The inlet is part of Qausuittuq National Park.

Geography
Notable landforms include: Emma Point to the west, Annie Point to the south, and Cracroft Sound to the east. The inlet contains one unnamed island. The Berkeley Islands are to the north and northwest.

References

External links
 Map of Qausuittuq National Park

Bays of Qikiqtaaluk Region